Račice is a village southeast of Podgrad in the Municipality of Ilirska Bistrica in the Inner Carniola region of Slovenia, close to the border with Croatia.

Unmarked grave
Račice is the site of an unmarked grave from the end of the Second World War. The Gradac Grave is located northwest of the village and contains the remains of a German soldier from the 97th Corps that fell at the beginning of May 1945.

Church
The local church in the settlement is dedicated to Saint Roch and belongs to the Parish of Podgrad.

References

External links

Račice on Geopedia

Populated places in the Municipality of Ilirska Bistrica